Urosalpinx dautzembergi is an extinct species of sea snail, a marine gastropod mollusk in the family Muricidae, the murex snails or rock snails.

Description

Distribution
Fossils were found in Pliocene and Pleistocene strata of Ecuador.

References

 Beu A.G. 2010. Neogene tonnoidean gastropods of tropical and South America: contributions to the Dominican Republic and Panama Paleontology Projects and uplift of the Central American Isthmus. Bulletins of American Paleontology 377-378: 550 pp, 79 pls.

External links
  Parodiz, Juan J., The taxa of fossil Mollusca introduced by Hermann von Ihering; Annals of the Carnegie Museum v. 65

dautzembergi
Gastropods described in 1897
Pliocene gastropods
Pleistocene gastropods